Sophie Madeleine (born Sophie Ball) is a ukulele player from Brighton. She released three solo albums; her third album, Silent Cynic, was released on 1 November 2013 after a crowdfunding campaign on PledgeMusic.

Career
Madeleine graduated from Bath Spa University with a BA in Commercial Music and a master's degree in Songwriting. While at Bath Spa, she was in the finals of the Musicians Benevolent Fund Songwriting Awards 2005 and she was in the band Oriole.

She produced her first album as a final year project at Bath Spa. She wrote her first ukulele song, Take Your Love With Me, for her then-boyfriend who had bought her that first ukulele. She also plays tenor guitar. A song from her first album, You Are My Favourite, was released as a charity single to raise money for Macmillan Cancer Support in memory of her father Ben, with a video featuring people from around the world who filmed themselves playing the song.

Also while in Bath, she met Hannah Rockcliffe (Hannah-Rei) with whom she formed the comedy-song duo Rocky and Balls, posting videos together on YouTube and recording one album in 2011.
Her second album was self-produced at home, and then mixed by Danton Supple. It was released in 2012, and initially sent out personally by Madeleine in a limited run.

Her third solo album was recorded in a studio in Brooklyn, the first to be entirely studio-based, which she described as "one of the most stressful experiences of my life". She published The Official Sophie Madeleine Ukulele Tab Book in 2013.

She became a copywriter at a Brighton-based advertising company in late 2014.

In 2015 she announced her retirement from music.

Performances
She supported Gruff Rhys, the lead singer of Super Furry Animals, on tour. In 2010, she performed at FestiFeel! along with Newton Faulkner and Babyhead to raise awareness of breast cancer and she performed at The Great Escape Festival's launch.

Reception 
Madeleine's success on YouTube has led to her being called an "internet sensation". Her music is covered by other artists so often that Finger magazine has crowned her "Queen of the Ukulele". She has over four million views on her YouTube channel.

Frank Turner is a fan of Madeleine's and has played her single "Oil and Gold" on his Steve Lamacq's BBC Radio 2 show. Brighton Source wrote that Madeleine's second album, The Rhythm You Started, is "a ray of sunshine every time we press play". The magazine Computer Music ran a full-page feature on Madeleine in its 2010 "How To Make It in Music" February special.

Internationally 
On 8 July 2010 "Take Your Love With Me (The Ukulele Song)" reached number 4 on iTunes' New Zealand Singer-Songwriter Music Chart. In 2012, Madeleine was interviewed on a Portuguese television documentary about ukuleles called Apanhei-te cavaquinho, for RTP2, where she also performed her song "Take Your Love With Me (The Ukulele Song)". Madeleine appeared on MTV Brasil in a short feature dedicated to her career.

Soundtracks
Her songs have been used on the soundtracks of several TV advertisements, notably on adverts for Postbank (You Make Me Happy), Pets at Home (You Make Me Happy), Macy's (Take Your Love With Me) and A1 Telekom Austria (One Fine Day). Her music has also been used on the soundtrack for the BBC programme The Great British Home Movie Roadshow in a segment featuring Spike Milligan.

Discography

Albums
Love. Life. Ukulele (Xtra Mile Recordings, 2009)
We Like Cake And Beards And Stuff – Rocky and Balls (self-released, May 2011)
The Rhythm You Started (Xtra Mile Recordings, 2011)
Silent Cynic (2013)

References

External links

People from Brighton
Musicians from Brighton and Hove
British ukulele players
English women guitarists
English guitarists
Living people
Year of birth missing (living people)
Alumni of Bath Spa University